is a JR West Geibi and Kisuki Line station in Hattori, Saijō-chō, Shōbara, Hiroshima Prefecture, Japan.

History
1935-12-20: Opens as the terminus of the Shōbara Line between Bingo-Saijō and Bingo-Ochiai
1936-10-10: Upon completion of the line from Onuka Station, becomes an intermediary stop on the Sanshin Line between Bitchū Kōjiro and Miyoshi
1937-07-01: Becomes a station on the nationalized Geibi Line, which stretches from Hiroshima to Niimi
1937-12-12: Becomes a junction station between the Kisuki Line and the Geibi Line
1987-04-01: Japan National Railways is privatized, and Bingo-Ochiai becomes a JR West station

Station structure
There is one station-side platform facing an island with two more platform faces.

Platform 1: Kisuki Line (trains toward Shinji Station)
Platform 2: Geibi Line (trains toward Miyoshi Station)
Platform 3: Geibi Line (trains toward Niimi Station).

Around the station
Hiroshima Prefectural Route 234 (Bingo-Ochiai Teishajō Route) connects Bingo-Ochiai station to Japan National Route 314.

Route 314 connects to Japan National Route 183 on the way toward Saijō.

Connecting lines
All lines are part of the JR West network.

Gallery

External links
 JR West 

Railway stations in Japan opened in 1935
Geibi Line
Railway stations in Hiroshima Prefecture
Shōbara, Hiroshima